List of Iranian artifacts abroad is a list of Iranian and Persian antiquities outside Iran, especially in museums.  Most of these were found outside modern Iran, in parts of the former Persian Empire, or places influenced by it.

Neighbors of Iran during the Achaemenid period

Afghanistan
 Tillya Tepe often known as the Bactrian gold  is a collection of about 20,600 ornaments, coins and other kinds of artifacts, made of gold, silver, ivory etc.,  that were found in six burial mounds (five women and one man) with extremely rich jewelry, dated to around the 1st century BCE-1st century CE. The ornaments include necklaces set with semi-precious stones, belts, medallions and a crown. After its discovery, the hoard went missing during the wars in Afghanistan, until it was "rediscovered" and first brought to public attention again in 2003. The heavily fortified town of Yemshi Tepe, just five kilometres to the northeast of modern Sheberghan on the road to Akcha, is only half a kilometre from the now-famous necropolis of Tillia-tepe. 
 Buddhas of Bamiyan For half a century, through war, anarchy and upheaval, Afghanistan has been stripped of tens of thousands of Buddhist and Hindu antiquities, 33 of those antiquities, were handed over to the Afghan ambassador,at a ceremony in New York.
The artifacts were part of a hoard of 2,500 objects seized in a dozen raids between 2012 and 2014 from Subhash Kapoor, a disgraced Manhattan art dealer currently jailed in India on smuggling and theft charges.

Gallery

Anatolia (Turkey)

Xerxes I inscription at Van is a trilingual cuneiform inscription of the Achaemenid King Xerxes I (486–465 BC). is located on the southern slope of a mountain adjacent to the Van Fortress, near Lake Van in present-day Turkey. When inscribed it was located in the Achaemenid province of Armenia. The niche was originally carved out by Xerxes' father, King Darius (522–486 BC), but he left the surface blank.

 A Persian city unearthed During the Oluz Höyük excavations in Amasya, column bases of a 2 thousand 500-year-old palace from the Persian period were unearthed. which reflects the Persian cultural character in terms of architecture, pottery and small finds, is divided into two main phases A and B. The head of the excavation, Professor of Archeology at Istanbul University, stated that they deepened the work after finding the remains of the city's road, mansion and fire temple. Dr. Şevket Dönmez said, “For the first time this year, a colonnaded reception hall called 'Apadana', a throne hall, and an executive hall began to come to light. We are just at the beginning of the excavations. But even the current findings are very exciting, ”he said.Emphasizing that the finds are very important in terms of Anatolian Iron Age history, Anatolian Ancient history and Persian archeology, Prof. Dr. Dönmez said, “Very important findings that identify and make it unique. Currently 6 column We have revealed the pedestal. Prof. Dr. Dönmez said, "Before we started the excavation, we did not know what such a Persian city we would find. Neither such a temple, nor such a reception hall. We did not guess anything. We would just dig an ordinary Central Anatolian mound and solve the problems of Iron Age culture by ourselves. Believe it now, the whole world has begun to follow Oluz Höyük. I think that after Göbeklitepe, Anatolia started to become a very important center that changed the history of religion in Anatolia.

Tbilisi 
Atashgah’. It means ‘place of fire’ and its use is usually associated with Zoroastrian fire temples. The history of the Atashgah in the capital city of Tbilisi goes back to the 5th or 6th century, when Persia was ruled by the Sasanian dynasty, of which Georgia was a part.

Also Treasure of Persian Manuscripts at Dagestan Scientific Centre.

Europe and the United States

 

The Metropolitan Museum of Art displays ancient Persian artifacts. Among the oldest items on display are dozens of clay bowls, jugs and engraved coins dating back 3,500 years and formerly housed in the University of Chicago's famed Oriental Institute.
 United Kingdom – Museums in UK have many Persian artifacts among them British Museum

The Cyrus Cylinder is an ancient clay cylinder, now broken into several pieces, on which is written a declaration in Akkadian cuneiform script in the name of Persia's Achaemenid king Cyrus the Great. It dates from the 6th century BC and was discovered in the ruins of Babylon in Mesopotamia (modern Iraq) in 1879. It was created and used as a foundation deposit following the Persian conquest of Babylon in 539 BC, when the Neo-Babylonian Empire was invaded by Cyrus and incorporated into his own empire. It is currently in the possession of the British Museum, which sponsored the expedition that discovered the cylinder.
France :The Louvre's department of Near Eastern antiquities was established in 1881 and presents an overview of early Near Eastern civilization and "first settlements", before the arrival of Islam. The department is divided into three geographic areas: the Levant, Mesopotamia (Iraq), and Persia (Iran). The collection's development corresponds to archaeological work such as Paul-Émile Botta's 1843 expedition to Khorsabad and the discovery of Sargon II's palace. These finds formed the basis of the Assyrian museum, the precursor to today's department.
The museum contains exhibits from Sumer and the city of Akkad, with monuments such as the Prince of Lagash's Stele of the Vultures from 2450 BC and the stele erected by Naram-Sin, King of Akkad, to celebrate a victory over barbarians in the Zagros Mountains. The  Code of Hammurabi, discovered in 1901, displays Babylonian Laws prominently, so that no man could plead their ignorance. The 18th-century BC mural of the Investiture of Zimrilim and the 25th-century BC Statue of Ebih-Il found in the ancient city-state of Mari are also on display at the museum.
The Persian portion of Louvre contains work from the archaic period, like the Funerary Head and the Persian Archers of Darius I. The section also contains rare objects from Persepolis which were lent to the British Museum for its Ancient Persia exhibition in 2005.

Oxus treasure

The Oxus treasure (Persian: گنجینه آمودریا) is a collection of about 180 surviving pieces of metalwork in gold and silver, the majority rather small, plus perhaps about 200 coins, all from the Achaemenid Persian period. The collection was found by the Oxus River sometime between 1877 and 1880. The exact place of the find remains unclear but is often proposed as being near Kobadiyan, Tajikistan. It is likely that many other pieces from the hoard were melted down for bullion; early reports suggest there were originally some 1500 coins and mention types of metalwork that are not among the surviving pieces. The metalwork is believed to date from the sixth to fourth centuries BC, but the coins show a greater range, with some of those believed to belong to the treasure coming from around 200 BC. The most likely origin for the treasure is that it belonged to a temple, where votive offerings were deposited over a long period. How it came to be deposited is unknown.

The British Museum now has nearly all the surviving metalwork, with one of the pair of griffin-headed bracelets on loan from the Victoria and Albert Museum, and displays them in Room 52. The group arrived at the museum by different routes, with many items bequeathed to the nation by Augustus Wollaston Franks. The coins are more widely dispersed, and more difficult to firmly connect with the treasure.  A group believed to come from it is in the Hermitage Museum in Saint Petersburg, and other collections have examples.

Japan 
The Miho Museum houses Mihoko Koyama's private collection of Asian Achaemenid, Sassanid and Western antiques bought on the world market by the Shumei organization in the years before the museum was opened in 1997. There are over two thousand pieces in the permanent collection, of which approximately 250 are displayed at any one time. Among the objects in the collection are more than 1,200 objects that appear to have been produced in Achaemenid Central Asia. Some scholars have claimed these objects are part of the Oxus Treasure, lost shortly after its discovery in 1877 and rediscovered in Afghanistan in 1993. The presence of a unique findspot for both the Miho acquisitions and the British Museum's material, however, has been challenged.

The Tokyo National Museum preserves a variety of Iranian antiquities and works of art, including pottery, paintings, calligraphy, metalwork, sculpture, inlaid pottery and textiles. .

Gallery

See also

Antiochus cylinder
Babylonian Chronicles
Babylonian Map of the World
Cylinders of Nabonidus
Cyrus Cylinder
Gilgamesh flood myth
Greater Iran
Jar of Xerxes I 
Kurkh Monoliths
Lachish reliefs
Lakh Mazar
Library of Ashurbanipal
Lion Hunt of Ashurbanipal
Persian Inscriptions on Indian Monuments
Rassam cylinder
Sennacherib's Annals
Tall-i Bakun
Xerxes I inscription at Van

Notes

References
5,000 years of Iranian culture showcased,BN Goswamy 

 Iranian Artifacts Abroad

Bibliography

 Forgotten Empire: The World of Ancient Persia by John Curtis (Editor), Nigel Tallis.
 Ancient Persia: A Concise History of the Achaemenid Empire, 550–330 BCE Paperback – Illustrated, January 20, 2014 by Matt Waters (Author).
Boardman, Sir John, "The Oxus Scabbard", Iran, Vol. 44, (2006), pp. 115–119, British Institute of Persian Studies, JSTOR
Collon, Dominique, "Oxus Treasure", Grove Art Online, Oxford Art Online, Oxford University Press, accessed 4 July 2013, subscription required.
Curtis, John, The Oxus Treasure, British Museum Objects in Focus series, 2012, British Museum Press, 
Curtis, John, "The Oxus Treasure in the British Museum", Ancient Civilizations from Scythia to Siberia, Vol. 10 (2004), pp. 293–338
"Curtis and Tallis", Curtis, John and Tallis, Nigel (eds), Forgotten Empire - The World of Ancient Persia (catalogue of British Museum exhibition), 2005, University of California Press/British Museum, google books
Dalton, O.M., The Treasure Of The Oxus With Other Objects From Ancient Persia And India, 1905 (nb, not the final 3rd edition of 1963), British Museum, online at archive.org, catalogs 177 objects, with a long introduction.
Frankfort, Henri, The Art and Architecture of the Ancient Orient, Pelican History of Art, 4th ed 1970, Penguin (now Yale History of Art), 
 
Muscarella, Oscar White, Archaeology, Artifacts and Antiquities of the Ancient Near East: Sites, Cultures, and Proveniences, 2013, BRILL, 9789004236691, google books
Yamauchi, Edwin M., review of The Treasure of the Oxus with Other Examples of Early Oriental Metal-Work, Journal of the American Oriental Society, Vol. 90, No. 2 (Apr. - Jun., 1970), pp. 340–343, JSTOR
"Zeymal": "E. V. Zeymal (1932-1998)", obituary by John Curtis, Iran, Vol. 37, (1999), pp. v-vi, British Institute of Persian Studies, JSTOR
 
 
 
 
 
 
 
 
 
 
 
 
 
 
 
 
 
 
 
 
 
 
 
 
 
 
 
 
 
 
 
 
 
 
 
 
 
 
 
 
 
 
 
 

19th-century archaeological discoveries
Ancient art
Archaeological artifacts
Archaeological sites in Afghanistan
Archaeology of the Achaemenid Empire
Iranian artifacts abroad
Asian archaeology
Iranian
Art Nouveau collections
Bactria
Cyrus the Great
Artifacts
Iranian archaeological sites
Jewellery
Lists of works of art
Middle Eastern objects in the British Museum
Old Persian language
Persian art
Saka
Sculpture of the Ancient Near East
Treasure troves of Asia